Reumén is a village located along Chile's Southern Railway about 8 km north of Paillaco. The village is bordered in the southeast by Collilelfu River.

References

Geography of Los Ríos Region
Populated places in Valdivia Province